Lydipta is a genus of longhorn beetles of the subfamily Lamiinae, containing the following species:

 Lydipta conspersa (Aurivillius, 1922)
 Lydipta humeralis (Martins & Galileo, 1995) 
 Lydipta pumilio (Thomson, 1868)
 Lydipta senicula (Bates, 1865)

References

Onciderini